Microbacterium halophilum is a bacterium from the genus Microbacterium.<

References

External links
Type strain of Microbacterium halophilum at BacDive -  the Bacterial Diversity Metadatabase

Further reading 
 

Bacteria described in 1998
halophilum